Książka i Wiedza ("Books and Knowledge") is a Polish publishing house founded in 1948, soon after World War II. As of the mid-2010s it has published over 13,000 titles.

In communist Poland it was the leading state publisher of books about politics and history. Książka i Wiedza now publishes non-fiction popular science books for the general reader, encyclopedias, dictionaries, history, philosophy, economy and self-help books on physical and psychological wellness. Its popular authors include Max Weber, Karl Raimund Popper, Bertrand Russell, Andrzej Zahorski, Henryk Samsonowicz, Nina Andrycz, and Jacek Pałkiewicz.

Its current editor-in-chief and president is Włodzimierz Gałąska.

Notes and references

Publishing companies of Poland
1948 establishments in Poland
Publishing companies established in 1948
Book publishing companies of Poland